Deliverance is the debut studio album by Canadian hip hop group Citizen Kane, released on September 14, 1999, by independent label Treehouse Records. It was nominated for Best Rap Recording at the 2000 Juno Awards. The 2001 documentary Raisin' Kane: A Rapumentary details the promotion and release of the album.

Reception
Del F. Cowie of Exclaim! praised Deliverance as a "well-executed project" that "trims the fat and maintains [the group's] previous high level of quality control."

Track listing

Samples
"Soldier Story" contains a sample of "The Changing World" by George Benson

References

1999 debut albums
Citizen Kane (band) albums